Shinner may refer to:

 A pejorative term for a supporter of Sinn Féin, a political party in Ireland 
Sometimes erroneously used as a term for the Irish Volunteers, due to their association with Sinn Féin
 Emily Shinner (1862–1901), English violinist
 James Shinner (1877–1921), English footballer